Chuck Priore (born February 17, 1960) is an American football coach and former player. He is the current head football coach at Stony Brook University, a position he has held since the 2006 season. Priore served the head football coach at Trinity College in Hartford, Connecticut from 2000 to 2005. He was also the head men's lacrosse coach at the University at Albany in 1986 and at Union College in Schenectady, New York from 1988 to 1991.

Priore's coaching style is known for his run-heavy offense and aggressive defense.

Playing career
Priore played football at the University at Albany before graduating in 1982. He was the starting fullback for three seasons and was named team captain before his senior year. In 1982, he won the Spud Kruzan Award, given to Albany's most outstanding athlete.

Coaching career
After the end of his playing career, Priore was the running backs and strength coach at Albany from 1983 to 1986. In 1986, he was also Albany's head lacrosse coach. Priore was the offensive coordinator, strength coach and head lacrosse coach at Union College from 1987 to 1991.

Priore was Penn's offensive coordinator from 1992 to 1999.

Trinity
Priore was head coach for six seasons at Trinity College where he led the Bantams to a 39–9 record including four consecutive New England Small College Athletic Conference (NESCAC) titles.

Stony Brook

Priore was named the second head football coach at Stony Brook University on December 10, 2005. In his first season, he led the Seawolves to a 5–6 record in their final season in the Northeast Conference. After plans were announced to move to the Big South Conference starting in 2008, Priore coached his team to a 6–5 record as an independent in 2007. From 2009 to 2012, he led the Seawolves to four consecutive Big South Championships, and in 2011 led the Seawolves to their first NCAA Division I Football Championship bid, advancing to the second round for the first time ever.

In January 2008, Priore's contract was extended through the 2012 season. After the 2009 season, Priore was given a one-year extension through 2013. In January 2011, Priore's contract was extended through 2016. In January 2013, after making the FCS playoffs for the first two times, Priore's contract was extended one year again through 2017. In 2016, Priore's contract was extended through 2020, but this was not made public until 2018. In 2018, following two consecutive FCS Playoffs appearances, Priore's contract was extended through 2022.

Head coaching record

Football

Personal life 
Priore's younger brother, Ray Priore, is currently the head football coach at UPenn.

References

External links
 Stony Brook profile

1960 births
Living people
American football fullbacks
Albany Great Danes football coaches
Albany Great Danes football players
Albany Great Danes men's lacrosse coaches
Penn Quakers football coaches
Stony Brook Seawolves football coaches
Trinity Bantams football coaches
Union Dutchmen football coaches
People from Long Island
Coaches of American football from New York (state)
University at Albany, SUNY alumni